The 2006–07 Indiana Pacers season was Indiana's 31st season in the NBA and 40th season as a franchise. They began the season hoping to improve upon their 41-41 output from the previous season. However, they came six wins shy of tying it, finishing 35-47. The Pacers would miss the playoffs for the first time since 1997.

Draft Selections

Season Summary
During the Summer of 2006, the Pacers lost Peja Stojakovic, whom they had just acquired in a trade from the Sacramento Kings during the previous season, in free agency to the New Orleans Hornets. Because of this, they were granted a trade exception by the NBA, which they used to re-acquire former Pacer Al Harrington from the Atlanta Hawks. They also pulled off two separate trades with the Dallas Mavericks, giving up established veterans Anthony Johnson and Austin Croshere for unexplained reasons. These two trades were disappointing to Pacers fans, who were confused by the trades and saw them as one-sided in the favor of the Mavericks. In June 2006, once-promising talent Jonathan Bender announced that he was retiring from the NBA at the age of 25, due to his struggles with knee injuries.  The Pacers had traded All-Star big man Antonio Davis to acquire Bender in 1999 when he was an 18-year-old rookie with great potential, but his constant injuries had prevented him from ever developing.

When the regular season finally started, the Pacers had a significantly different roster than they did at the end of the previous season. The Pacers hovered around the .500 mark for most of the season, and were a borderline playoff team. In January 2007, the Pacers pulled off another major trade, this time with the Golden State Warriors, giving up troubled swingman Stephen Jackson, Al Harrington, and other pieces for versatile big man Troy Murphy and unproven swingman Mike Dunleavy as well as some other pieces. This trade was perceived as the only way for the Pacers to finally part ways with Jackson, who had lost the respect of Pacers fans due to his involvement in "The Brawl" and in a shooting at an Indianapolis nightclub. After the trade, the Pacers fell downward in the standings, marked by an 11-game losing streak which stretched from late February to mid-March, and eventually were eliminated from qualification for the 2007 NBA Playoffs. This would be the first time the Pacers missed the playoffs since the 1996-97 season, and the first of a streak of four seasons of missing the playoffs. Ironically, the perennial basement-dweller Warriors wound up making the playoffs for the first time since the 1993-94 season, and even advanced to the second round by upsetting the first-seeded Mavericks 4-2 in the first round.  This left the dwindling community of Pacers fans with a sour taste in their mouths as they wondered how far the team might have gone if the trade in January had not occurred. Thus, coach Rick Carlisle was fired at the conclusion of the Pacers' season in April, and it was announced in May that Jim O'Brien, former head coach of the Boston Celtics and Philadelphia 76ers, would replace him as the Pacers' head coach for the next season.

Regular season

Season standings

Record vs. opponents

Roster

Game log

Player statistics

Regular season 

|-
| 
| 81 || 4 || 15.7 || .414 || .336 || .785 || 1.7 || 2.4 || .9 || .1 || 5.6
|-
| 
| 47 || 2 || 8.6 || style=";"| .645 || .429 || .787 || 1.6 || .3 || .3 || .4 || 2.9
|-
| 
| 45 || 4 || 17.8 || .459 || .231 || .700 || 1.8 || 1.3 || .6 || .2 || 7.1
|-
| 
| 42 || 2 || 12.8 || .454 || . || .802 || 3.3 || .5 || .1 || .4 || 5.8
|-
| 
| 43 || 43 || style=";"| 35.6 || .454 || .283 || .792 || 5.7 || 2.6 || 1.1 || .2 || 14.0
|-
| 
| 75 || 43 || 23.2 || .469 || .000 || .639 || 8.1 || .8 || .8 || .5 || 4.3
|-
| 
| style=";"| 82 || 57 || 34.0 || .459 || .382 || .803 || 4.6 || 1.4 || .8 || .7 || 13.9
|-
| 
| 41 || 0 || 6.2 || .371 || .182 || .600 || 1.1 || .5 || .4 || .1 || 1.5
|-
| 
| 36 || 36 || 33.6 || .458 || style=";"| .458 || .713 || 6.3 || 1.4 || .7 || .3 || 15.9
|-
| 
| 24 || 2 || 7.9 || .517 || . || .500 || 1.8 || .3 || .2 || .5 || 3.0
|-
| 
| 37 || 32 || 32.1 || .419 || .297 || .822 || 2.6 || 3.1 || .9 || .5 || 14.1
|-
| 
| 37 || 1 || 17.9 || .412 || .372 || style=";"| .922 || 1.3 || 3.0 || .4 || .0 || 7.4
|-
| 
| 40 || 2 || 9.0 || .360 || .222 || .689 || .7 || .3 || .3 || .1 || 2.5
|-
| 
| 22 || 7 || 15.4 || .386 || .318 || .880 || 1.0 || 2.0 || .3 || .1 || 4.2
|-
| 
| 42 || 31 || 28.2 || .461 || .409 || .772 || 6.1 || 1.6 || .6 || .6 || 11.1
|-
| 
| 69 || 69 || 35.6 || .436 || .000 || .767 || style=";"| 9.6 || 2.4 || .7 || style=";"| 2.6 || style=";"| 19.4
|-
| 
| 7 || 0 || 9.1 || .133 || . || .667 || 2.7 || .4 || .0 || .0 || 1.7
|-
| 
| 72 || style=";"| 72 || 31.2 || .389 || .316 || .720 || 3.3 || style=";"| 6.9 || style=";"| 1.6 || .3 || 12.8
|-
| 
| 46 || 3 || 12.1 || .469 || .365 || .550 || 1.8 || .5 || .1 || .2 || 3.9
|}

Awards and records
 Jermaine O'Neal, NBA All-Star Game

Transactions

Roster changes

Additions

Subtractions

References

Indiana Pacers seasons
Pace
Pace
Indiana